Naresh  Balyan is an Indian politician and a member of the Sixth Legislative Assembly of Delhi in India. He represents the Uttam Nagar constituency of New Delhi and is a member of the  Aam Aadmi Party political party.

Early life and education
Naresh Balyan was born in Delhi. He attended the Haryana Shakti Senior Secondary  School.

Political career
Naresh Balyan has been a MLA for one term. He represented the Uttam Nagar constituency and is a member of the Aam Aadmi Party political party.

On 21 Sep 2015, Balyan complained to police that a fake letter containing his forged signature was spread in the social media. In the letter, it alleges that Balyan bought onions from the government at Rs 26 per kg and sold them at Rs 30 per kg. Balyan said that the language used in the fabricated letter made no sense, moreover the government does not provide onions to the MLAs for sale.

On 24 February 2018, Balyan was booked after government officials complained to police that he had made inflammatory remarks against them. In 2021, a court in Delhi exonerated him of all charges in the case.

He has served as the DDC Chairman - South Delhi and was a councillor since 2012. No work was done and the aam aadmi party claims everyone else is responsible. He is a member of the Delhi Jal Board. He is an aam aadmi worth over 56cr according to his disclosures in the electoral forms

Member of Legislative Assembly
In 2015 he was elected as the MLA representing Uttam Nagar in the Sixth Legislative Assembly of Delhi. He was re-elected to the Delhi Legislative Assembly in 2020.

Committee assignments of Delhi Legislative Assembly 
Chairman - Unauthorised Colony Committee, New Delhi

Member of Legislative Assembly (2020 - present)
Since 2020, he is an elected member of the 7th Delhi Assembly.

Committee assignments of Delhi Legislative Assembly
 Member (2022-2023), Public Accounts Committee

Electoral performance

References 

1976 births
Aam Aadmi Party politicians from Delhi
Delhi MLAs 2015–2020
Delhi MLAs 2020–2025
Living people
People from New Delhi